The Mjeda family (Italian: Miedia), is a noble Albanian family which played a prominent role in the history of Albania and Kosovo in the 19th and early 20th century.

History 
 

The progenitor of the family, Bardhi, settled in Shkodër from the village of Kryezi in the Pukë region. He took the name Mjeda from the village near Shkodër where he held lands. The surname Mjeda is mentioned among the Arbëreshë of Cosenza in 1468 and in Shkodër in 1736. The family today consists of two branches: Prizren and Shkodër. They became the leading Catholic family of Prizren, having the noble title of effendi, and were engaged in trade between the Italian peninsula, Constantinople, and the Balkans.

Over the centuries, members of the family were merchants, landowners, clerics, and political leaders. Today, members of the family mainly live in Albania and Croatia.

Notable members 
 Ndre Mjeda (1866-1937), Albanian intellectual, jesuit priest, philologist, poet, and deputy in the National Assembly of Albania, during the Albanian National Awakening period. Delegate at the Congress of Manastir.
 Lukë Simon Mjeda (1867-1951), merchant and landowner who represented Prizren at the Second League of Prizren (1943).
 Lazër Mjeda (1869-1935), Bishop of Sapë (1900-1904), Archbishop of Skopje (1904-1909), Archbishop of Shkodër (1921-1935).
 Kolë Mjeda (1885-1951), Mayor of Shkodër (1924-1925), Vice-President of the National Assembly of Albania, Prefect of Dibër County.
 Luigj Pashko Mjeda (1890-1962), merchant, landowner, editor of the "Ora e Maleve" newspaper, head of the Municipality of Shkodër tax authority, and co-founder of the Bogdani Theatrical Society in Shkodër.
Jak Mjeda, President of the Filigran Company, which employed 153 goldsmiths in Prizren.

References 

Albanian Roman Catholics
People from Shkodër
19th-century Albanian people
People from Prizren
People from Scutari vilayet
18th-century Albanian people
20th-century Albanian people
Families from the Ottoman Empire